Dragonmead is a U.S. microbrewery, meadery and brewpub founded by Earl Scherbarth, Larry Channell, and Bill Wrobel in January 1997. The small brewery produces many varieties of beer, wine, and mead, and has received awards including gold medals at the World Beer Cup.

History 
Before opening the Dragonmead Larry Channel and Bill Wrobel worked for Chrysler while Earl Scherbarth worked at Ford. Their first interest in brewing came from a home brew kit  bought for Scherbarth's birthday. They decided to try different methods and ingredients to create new beers. During this period the group of friends looked into starting a business in the areas of computers or printing. Wrobel proposed that they start a brewery after they became familiar with the process of brewing. A year later the partners opened Dragonmead in May 1998. The company still sells to the home-brew community.

In 1998, the Bay City Times wrote: 
 "Word about Dragonmead's magic is spreading, though they only make 18 barrels weekly and won't reach full capacity at their hospital-clean  factory until spring 1999. Detroit celebrity chef Jimmy Schmidt stocks Dragonmead at various high-end restaurants."
Johnny Klein, owner of Steamers Pub, on Bay City's West Side, and Steamers Pub South, in Saginaw, praised the brewery and its product.

In 2015, the brewery surpassed its "nanobrewery" character, upgrading to an 11,000 square foot facility, with a 1,000 square foot taproom, and re-purposing old equipment.  It used a three-barrel system to produce 2,500 barrels per year. The brewery purchased and installed a computer-automated Braumat software driven unit. According to Channell, the increased capacity will enable the pub to increase the number of "taps from 52 to 103 or more, and have at least one of each Beer Judge Certification Program-accepted style and sub-style available".  The brewers intend to extend their distribution.  More seasonal brews are expected with the expansion.

Beers
Dragonmead uses at least 57 types of grain for brewing, and sometimes as many as 75 from seven countries in a year. Yeast strains  the company stocks fifteen  are used only once for brewing. The brewery's most popular product is named Final Absolution Trippel, a bottled ale. in December 2014 the brewing system was expanded to allow the production of an increased range of beers.

This brewery has formulated beer recipes for 26 varieties. These include multiple formulations of American style ales, English ales, German-style ales, a German lager, Belgian ales, Scottish ales, and a Russian Imperial Stout.  Other regionally distributed beers include "Under the Kilt Wee Heavy" (7.8% ABV Scottish style strong ale), and Sin Eater {11% ABV Belgian strong dark ale}.  The "Big 5" are their most popular beers, available as four-bottle packs in stores  On tap the pub features a wide range of beers, including seasonal varieties.  The scope of the brewery's distribution has widened.

A part of their effort is to brew to type, they use proper geographically relevant ingredients.

Facilities
As the Chicago Tribune noted and photographed, the bar features a plethora of unconventional beer tap handles, i.e., just a portion of the 75 handles were photographed, "plus the stained-glass windows in the mirror's reflection. Belgian abbey, medieval watering hole, or Dungeon's & Dragons haunt: you decide."  Other crafted tap handles include Erik the Red, Coppershield Bitter Harvest, Excalibur Barley Wine and Russian Imperial Stout, all of which have their own escutcheon.  The decor includes two large vitreous glass tile mosaics, "Shield" by William Wrobel.  He also crafted two large leaded art glass windowsThe Knight's Window and The Dragon's Window.  The bar itself was 6 years in the making by Dragonmead owner D. Earl Scherbarth, and includes a "copper-top back bar with custom oak cabinetry.

Awards
The brewery won a 2006 Gold Medal in the World Beer Cup  popularly and unofficially called "The Olympics of Beer"  for their Belgian Triple Final Absolution, at 10% ABV with a rating of 94 at RateBeer.  That beer is memorialized in a beer tap handle.  Another World Cup gold medalist was an English-style bitter, "Crusader Dark Mild Ale".  In 2012, Dragonmead double-medaled at the World Beer Cup.

Through end of 2014, the brewery has been awarded five prestigious World Beer Cup medals, and five medals from the International Mazer Cup Mead Competition.  Combined with "numerous local and national awards, Dragonmead Microbrewery is one of the most-awarded breweries in the United States."

It was named by RateBeer to its list of "Top 50 Breweries to Visit in the World".

Other products
The brewery also produces mead.  In 2014, the brewery garnered five awards at the Mazer Cup International Mead Competition.  1st place ESB, Braggot; 2nd place Crooked Door Braggot; 2nd place Strawberry Mead Dessert; 3rd place Medieval Spice Pumpkin Dessert; 1st place Cherry Mead Mellomel Dry.

The brewer also produces and serves its own root beer and sodas.

The brewpub now operates a kitchen with a specialized menu designed to be in accord with the beer.  Growler beer bottles are filled and beer flights are served.

Related joint venture and trade organizations
Dragonmead entered into a joint venture with another Warren, Michigan microbrewery, Kuhnhenn Brewing Company. The agreement entailed production of "Dark Heathen", an "extremely high gravity Doopelbock-hybrid style of beer". This 12.5% ABV beverage would take 6 months of lagering before being packaged.

Dragonmead is a member of the Michigan Brewers Guild and the national Brewer's Association. Their individual brewers are members of the Master Brewers’ Association of the Americas Detroit chapter.

It also supports "Fermenta," a specialized trade group founded by women in Michigan (at a meeting April 2014 at the Arbor Brewing Company) that is "committed to diversity, camaraderie, networking, [networking] and education within the craft beverage industry."  It is one of 11 Michigan craft breweries participating along with the Michigan Brewers Guild.

See also

 List of microbreweries

Notes

References

External links

Beer brewing companies based in Michigan
Companies based in Macomb County, Michigan
Companies established in 1998
Tourist attractions in Macomb County, Michigan
Warren, Michigan